Psorospermum is a genus of flowering plants in the family Hypericaceae.

Species
The following 15 species are in the genus Psorospermum:

Psorospermum alternifolium Hook.f.
Psorospermum baumii Engl.
Psorospermum cerasifolium Baker
Psorospermum chionanthifolium Spach
Psorospermum crenatum (Pers.) Hochr.
Psorospermum fanerana Baker
Psorospermum febrifugum Spach
Psorospermum glaberrimum Hochr.
Psorospermum lanceolatum (Choisy) Hochr.
Psorospermum laxiflorum (Engl.) Engl.
Psorospermum mechowii Engl.
Psorospermum molluscum (Pers.) Hochr.
Psorospermum revolutum (Choisy) Hochr.
Psorospermum senegalense Spach
Psorospermum tenuifolium Hook.f.

References

 
Malpighiales genera